The Owl Creek Trail is a  long hiking trail in the far northern region of Grand Teton National Park in the U.S. state of Wyoming. The trail begins at a junction on the Berry Creek Trail and traverses west then south to Moose Basin Divide where it meets the Webb Canyon Trail. Located in the remote northern backcountry of Grand Teton National Park, the trail is not connected to maintained trails in the southern part of the park and must be accessed from the Glade Creek trailhead in the John D. Rockefeller, Jr. Memorial Parkway. From Glade Creek, it is a  hike to the Berry Creek Trail and then another  to the trail junction. The Owl Creek Trail follows Owl Creek west then south and passes south of Forellen Peak. The trail requires numerous stream crossings which can be dangerous during spring melt.

See also
List of hiking trails in Grand Teton National Park

References

Hiking trails of Grand Teton National Park